The India International Friendship Society (IIFS) is a private voluntary organisation based in New Delhi, India. Its stated aim is to strengthen the ties between India and its expatriate community in the hope of using the resources and potential of the expatriates to benefit India. The organisation's chief activity is the awarding of the Glory of India Award (also called the "Bharat Jyoti Award") in ceremonies held regularly in New Delhi and in international cities with large expatriate Indian communities.

The validity of the awards has been called into question, based on the request for biographical data from award invitees accompanied by a request for the payment of a fee of Rs12,500.

Awardees
Among its awardees, IIFS counts the following prominent people:

 Dev Anand
 Prema Cariappa
 Sunil Dutt
 Shamim Jairajpuri
 Basappa Danappa Jatti
 Rajesh Khanna
 Owais Mohammad
 Prem Chand Pandey
 Kamlesh Patel
 Amichand Rajbansi
 Dhirubhai Shah
 Chaudhary Ishwar Singh
 Marsha Singh
 Ashok Sinha
 R. Sowdhamini
 Nirmal Chandra Suri
 Harinder Takhar
 Mother Teresa
 Pankaj Udhas
 Bharati Vaishampayan
 Drukchen Jigme Pema Wangchen

References

External links
 

Indian awards
Indian diaspora